The Arctic coastal tundra is an ecoregion of the far north of North America, an important breeding ground for a great deal of wildlife.

Setting
This ecoregion is located on the north coast of Alaska, and includes the east coast plain of Banks Island, as well as the Anderson River and Horton River plains, and the Tuktoyaktuk coast in the Northwest Territories. This is an area of low, flat, boggy coastal plains. The underlying soil of this damp Arctic coast is thick, solid permafrost, covered in summer with thermokarst "thaw lakes" of melted ice. Ice features such as ice wedges and pingo mounds of soil and ice can be found. This coast has an arctic climate warm enough to allow plant growth in late-June, July and August only, and even then frosts may occur. On the whole this is a damper, wetter area than the Low Arctic tundra ecoregion that continues along the coast west of here to Quebec.

Flora
This area supports wetland plants especially sedges and grasses, mosses and lichens, and right on the coast there are peat bogs. Trees such as dwarf birch, willows, northern Labrador tea (Dryas) and alders grow in the warmer areas of the region, the Mackenzie River delta and the Yukon coast.

Fauna
This region provides calving habitat for four herds of caribou, the Western Arctic, Teshekpuk, Central Arctic, and Porcupine caribou herds. Another key species is the muskox of Banks Island and the Arctic National Wildlife Refuge coast. Other mammals include lemmings, polar bear, walrus, beluga whale, snowshoe hare and Arctic hare, red fox, grey wolf, Arctic ground squirrel and seals. The coast is also home to many breeding waterbirds including snow goose, spectacled eider, Steller's eider, king eider, and yellow-billed loon. Important bird areas include the Colville River delta, Teshekpuk Lake (which is within the National Petroleum Reserve–Alaska), and Kasegaluk Lagoon a breeding area for brant goose. Predatory birds include the snowy owls that hunt waterbirds and lemmings. Fish of the waters here include the Arctic char.

Threats and preservation
90% of natural habitat remains intact, except for the vicinity of Utqiaġvik, Alaska and the oil fields of Prudhoe Bay, Alaska and Kuparuk which are expanding along the coast and may in future spread into the Arctic National Wildlife Refuge, which is the only major protected area on this coast (see Arctic Refuge drilling controversy), and on and around the Dalton Highway and the Trans-Alaska Pipeline.

See also 
 List of ecoregions in Canada (WWF)
 List of ecoregions in the United States (WWF)

References

External links

Tundra ecoregions
Ecoregions of Alaska
 
Nearctic ecoregions
Ecozones and ecoregions of Yukon
Ecozones and ecoregions of the Northwest Territories